Shisakhani is a village development committee in Baglung District in the Daulagiri Zone of central Nepal. At the time of the 1991 Nepal census it had a population of 1,845 and had 311 houses in the village.

References

Populated places in Baglung District